Central York is a rural community in the Canadian province of New Brunswick. It was formed through the 2023 New Brunswick local governance reforms.

History 
Central York was incorporated on January 1, 2023 from previously unincorporated areas.

See also 
List of communities in New Brunswick
List of municipalities in New Brunswick

References 

2023 establishments in New Brunswick
2023 New Brunswick local governance reform
Populated places established in 2023
Rural communities in New Brunswick